USCS Madison was a schooner that served as a survey ship in the United States Coast Survey from 1850 to 1858. She was named for Founding Father and U.S. president James Madison.

Madisons origins are obscure, but the Coast Survey acquired her in 1850 and placed her in service along the United States East Coast, where she spent her entire Coast Survey career. She was retired in 1858.

See also 

 
 USS James Madison
 SS President Madison

References
 NOAA History, A Science Odyssey: Tools of the Trade: Ships: Coast and Geodetic Survey Ships: Madison

Ships of the United States Coast Survey
Schooners of the United States
Virginia-related ships
1850 ships
Ships named for Founding Fathers of the United States